Jürgen Hasler (born 7 May 1973) is a Liechtensteiner former alpine skier who competed in the 1994 Winter Olympics, 1998 Winter Olympics and 2002 Winter Olympics.

References

External links
 sports-reference.com

1973 births
Living people
Liechtenstein male alpine skiers
Olympic alpine skiers of Liechtenstein
Alpine skiers at the 1994 Winter Olympics
Alpine skiers at the 1998 Winter Olympics
Alpine skiers at the 2002 Winter Olympics